Zhi is a Chinese family name. , it ranks as the 163rd most common Chinese surname in Mainland China.

Origin 
One origin of the surname came from descendants of Zhi Fu during the Three Sovereigns and Five Emperors in ancient China.

Many non-Han Chinese groups adopted the surname Zhi. In the Qin and Han dynasties, Yuezhi simplified their names to Zhi.

Notable people

Historical 
 Lokaksema, a Buddhist monk who traveled to China during the Han dynasty and translated Buddhist texts into Chinese, and, as such, is an important figure in Chinese Buddhism.
 Zhidun, Buddhist monk and philosopher.
 Zhi Qian, a Buddhist monk who translated a wide range of Indian Buddhist scriptures into Chinese.
 Wang Shichong, a general of Sui dynasty who deposed Sui's last emperor Yang Tong and briefly ruled as the emperor of a succeeding state of Zheng.
 , a politician in the Ming dynasty.

Contemporary 
 Chi-Ming Che, a Hong Kong chemist and an academician of the Chinese Academy of Sciences.
 Zhi Bingyi, a scientist and an academician of the Chinese Academy of Sciences.
 Zhi Shuping, a politician in the People's Republic of China.
 , a retired Chinese football player.
 Zhi Yaqi, a Chinese football player.

References 

 

Chinese-language surnames